Firuz Ja-ye Sabet (also Romanized as Fīrūz Jā-ye S̄ābet; also known as Fīrūz Jāh and Fīrūz Jāh-e S̄ābet) is a village in Firuzjah Rural District, Bandpey-ye Sharqi District, Babol County, Mazandaran Province, Iran. At the 2006 census, its population was 408, in 89 families.

References 

Populated places in Babol County